Zygocerini is a tribe of longhorn beetles of the subfamily Lamiinae. It was described by Lacordaire in 1872.

Taxonomy
Zygocerini contains the following genera:
 Annemabel Slipinski & Escalona, 2013
 Calezygocera Vives & Sudre, 2013
 Carteridion Slipinski & Escalona, 2013
 Demonassa Thomson, 1864
 Disterna Thomson, 1864
 Falsotmesisternus Breuning, 1961
 Pseudozygocera Breuning, 1948
 Scapozygocera Breuning, 1947
 Scapozygoceropsis Breuning, 1973
 Zygocera Erichson, 1842

References

 
Lamiinae